is a railway station in the city of Murakami, Niigata, Japan, operated by East Japan Railway Company (JR East).

Lines
Iwafunemachi Station is served by the Uetsu Main Line, and is 55.2 kilometers from the starting point of the line at Niitsu Station.

Station layout
The station consists of one island platform connected to the station building by a footbridge. The station is unattended.

Platforms

History
Iwafunemachi Station opened on 1 November 1914. A new station building was completed in 1980. With the privatization of Japanese National Railways (JNR) on 1 April 1987, the station came under the control of JR East.

Surrounding area
 
former Kamihayashi village hall
Kamihayashi post Office

See also
 List of railway stations in Japan

External links
 JR East station information 

Stations of East Japan Railway Company
Railway stations in Niigata Prefecture
Uetsu Main Line
Railway stations in Japan opened in 1914
Murakami, Niigata